Vaibhavi Shandilya is an Indian actress who works in Tamil, Kannada and Marathi-language films. After making her debut in the Marathi film Janiva (2015), she has been in films including Ekk Albela (2015), Sakka Podu Podu Raja (2017), Iruttu Araiyil Murattu Kuththu (2018), Cap maari (2019) and Gaalipata 2 (2022).

Career
Vaibhavi made her acting debut in the Marathi film Janiva (2015), a tale on social justice, which was noted for marking the debut of actor Mahesh Manjrekar's son, Sathya. Vaibhavi then featured amongst an ensemble cast including Vidya Balan in Bhagwan Dada's biopic, Ekk Albela where she portrayed a Muslim girl called Shaheen.

In 2016, Vaibhavi appeared in an Egyptian Arabic film Gahem Fe El Hend as a dancer in a special song called "Tak Dhinna". It was choreographed by famous Indian dance choreographer Vishnu Deva. Vaibhavi signed on to appear in two Tamil language films opposite Santhanam — Server Sundaram and Sakka Podu Podu Raja, where the latter released in 2017 and the former to be released in 2018. Vaibhavi signed her third Tamil film opposite Gautham Karthik in Iruttu Araiyil Murattu Kuththu in 2018. she debuted kannada industry with Raj Vishnu and acted in super hit movie Gaalipata 2 opposite Ganesh.

Filmography

Web series

References

External links 
 

Indian film actresses
Living people
Actresses in Tamil cinema
Actresses in Marathi cinema
Actresses in Kannada cinema
21st-century Indian actresses
1995 births